The falcated wren-babbler (Ptilocichla falcata) is a species of bird in the family Pellorneidae.
It is endemic to Palawan.

Its natural habitat is tropical moist lowland forest.
It is threatened by habitat loss.

Description 
EBird describes the bird as "A striking medium-sized bird of lowland and foothill forest floor or dense undergrowth on Palawan and Balabac. Often found near streams and gullies. Has a blackish body with long white streaks and contrasting rufous wings and tail blending to a blackish tip. Appears hooded, with orange from the crown to the back of the neck, a bright white throat with a fine black moustache stripe, and a black mask. Unmistakable in range. Voice includes slightly rising or falling long, alternating whistles, “puuuuui! piuuuuu!” or a quicker, repeated phrase, “chooit chi-peeet!”

Habitat and conservation status 
It inhabits tropical moist lowland primary forest up to 800 meters above sea level. It is often found near streams, ridges and bamboo forests. It is sensitive to habitat loss and cannot tolerate secondary forest.

IUCN has assessed this bird as vulnerable with its population being estimated at 10,000 to 19,999 mature individuals. Forest loss, due to legal and illegal logging, mining and conversion into farmland and urban development, is its main threat.

The whole of Palawan was designated as a Biosphere Reserve; however, protection and enforcement of laws has been difficult and these threats still continue. It occurs in just one protected area in Puerto Princesa Subterranean River National Park.

Conservation actions proposed include surveys of remaining lowland forest to understand its true distribution and population status and to propose key sites as protected areas; to assess its ecological requirements, particularly its sensitivity to habitat modification; to support the extension of Puerto Princesa Subterranean River National Park; and to formally protect the forests of Iwahig Prison and Penal Farm.

References

Collar, N. J. & Robson, C. 2007. Family Timaliidae (Babblers)  pp. 70 – 291 in; del Hoyo, J., Elliott, A. & Christie, D.A. eds. Handbook of the Birds of the World, Vol. 12. Picathartes to Tits and Chickadees. Lynx Edicions, Barcelona.

falcated wren-babbler
Birds of Palawan
falcated wren-babbler
Taxonomy articles created by Polbot